Tuckahoe River may refer to:

Tuckahoe River (New Jersey),  river in southern New Jersey
Tuckahoe Creek, in Maryland